Summer of My German Soldier is a 1973 book by Bette Greene.

The story is told in first person narrative by a twelve-year-old Jewish girl named Patty Bergen living in Jenkinsville, Arkansas during World War II. The story focuses on the friendship between Patty and an escaped German POW named Anton. Patty first meets Anton when a group of German POWs visits her father's store. Anton teaches Patty that she is a person of value. In return, she protects Anton by hiding him above her father's garage.

The book was followed by a sequel, Morning Is a Long Time Coming.

Characters

Main characters
 Patricia Anne Bergen: Patricia is a 12-year-old Jewish girl living in Jenkinsville, Arkansas near the end of World War II. Patty is very intelligent and intellectually curious, particularly about words. On the other hand, she can also be naïve and unworldly. At the beginning of the novel, Patty has low self-esteem brought on by her mother's criticism of her appearance and her father's outright abuse. During the novel and as Patty becomes friends with Anton, she begins to gain the self-esteem and confidence she is lacking.
 Fredrick Anton Reiker: Anton, a Lower Saxon foot soldier who comes from Göttingen, but is half-English (his mother is from Manchester). His English-educated father is a professor of history who gets into trouble for making fun of Hitler in lectures. Anton has no sympathy either with the Nazi party or its ideology. Later on in the novel, he teaches Patty that she is a person of value.
 Ruth Hughes: The Bergen's African-American maid who takes care of Patty and Patty's sister, Sharon. As one of the individuals who is closest to Patty, she is very loving and is extremely influential in Patty's life. She is the only individual who knows that Patty is hiding Anton in their garage, and keeps the secret well.
 Harry Bergen: Patty's abusive father who runs a local department store. He is known for flirting with other women in town and is very conscious of money. Harry seems to loathe his elder daughter and tends to favor his younger daughter, Sharon.
 Pearl Bergen: Pearl is Patty's mother. Pearl is a vain woman who negatively comments on Patty's looks and behavior, both directly to her daughter and to others. As the story is being told through Patty's eyes, she also tends to favor her younger daughter, Sharon.

Minor characters

 Sharon Bergen: Patty's younger sister. Sharon is favored by her parents and most people in Jenkinsville. Patty is jealous of the adoration and encouragement her sister receives from their parents, but is still very fond of her sister.
 Freddy Dowd: Patty's only school friend. Patty's father doesn't approve of their friendship, possibly because he is poor. Twice in the book, Harry Bergen beats Patty with his belt when he catches her with Freddy. Freddy is slow and naive, and does not understand Patty's reluctance to be friends with him, which she feels unable to explain truthfully.
 Edna Louise Jackson: A wealthy friend of Patty's. Along with most of the children Patty is friends with, Edna goes away to Baptist camp for most of the summer. Patty wants to be able to go, too, but her mother will not permit it because they are Jewish. It is revealed at one point that Edna's grandfather cheated Ruth's mother out of her life savings, an example of the themes of hypocrisy and injustice that the book addresses.
 Charlene Madlee: A reporter and friend of Patty's. They meet at Patty's father's store. Charlene inspires Patty to want to become a journalist and gives her hope for the future. Charlene also is the one who brings Patty news of her trial.
 Sister Parker: Works at the department store and was present when Anton first came in. She is also the worker Patty tells about the golden ring. She tends to have a love of gossip.

Setting
Early 1940s in Jenkinsville, Arkansas, at Patty's house and her grandparents' house.

Themes

The many themes explored in this novel include prejudice, self-esteem and family.

Prejudice exists in many forms, some of them ironic. While Anton, as a German soldier, might be assumed to be a Nazi sympathizer and therefore antisemitic, he is not pro-Nazi and develops a relationship with Patty, who is Jewish. He is, however, a German patriot and wants desperately to get back to Germany. On the other hand, the townspeople show prejudice towards the German soldiers, and many white families in town employ black servants, paying them a fair wage for their services.

Another theme is that of self-esteem, especially in the face of abuse or personal difficulty.
At the beginning of the book, Patty is abused by her father and is insulted by her mother. As she gets to know Anton and forms an attachment to him, her self-esteem grows and she learns that she has value as a person.

Family is another reoccurring theme in this novel, more prominently in negative ways towards the main character, Patty.

Adaptations
In 1978, the novel was turned into a made-for-television film of the same name, starring Kristy McNichol as Patty and Bruce Davison as Anton. It was well received, winning a Humanitas Prize, and three Primetime Emmy Award nominations (with Esther Rolle winning "Best Supporting Actress" for her portrayal of Ruth). In the film version, the town of Jenkinsville is set in the state of Georgia, not Arkansas. 

A musical version of the novel opened in Ohio in August 2002, staged by Encore Theater Company.

Reception
Summer of My German Soldier was an ALA Notable Book, a New York Times Outstanding Book, and a National Book Award Finalist. Greene's work was described as "courageous and compelling" by Publishers Weekly. Summer of My German Soldier is one of the most banned or challenged books of 2000-2009 according to the American Library Association, coming in at number 55.

The mockumentary C.S.A.: The Confederate States of America, which details an alternate history wherein the Confederacy won the Civil War, refers to an in-universe novel called "Summer of My Union Soldier," which is described as echoing romanticism in the literature dealing with the American North and South.

References

Notes

Sources
 Greene, Bette. Summer of My German Soldier. Bantam Doubleday Dell Books: New York, NY, 1993. .USA.

1973 American novels
Golden Kite Award-winning works
Jews and Judaism in Arkansas
Novels set in Arkansas
Novels set during World War II
American novels adapted into films
American young adult novels
Dial Press books
First-person narrative novels